Harding Creek is a stream in the U.S. state of South Dakota.

Harding Creek has the name of William Harding, an early settler.

See also
List of rivers of South Dakota

References

Rivers of Haakon County, South Dakota
Rivers of Ziebach County, South Dakota
Rivers of South Dakota